The Curmsun Disc is a concave gold disc, thought to date from the 10th century, which was rediscovered in 2014 by an 11-year old Polish girl in Sweden, after she showed it to her history teacher.

The Danish Viking king Harald Bluetooth is mentioned in the inscription of the disc. The disc's characteristics are influenced by Byzantine coins and seals.

Curmsun represents the king's patronymic (son of Gorm the Old); in standardized Old Norse, .

Origin
The Curmsun disc was reportedly found as part of a Viking Age hoard discovered in 1841 in the cellar crypt of the ruined church in the village of Wiejkowo in Pomerania (now part of Gmina Wolin, Poland).  This location is just east of the bank of the river Dziwna and near the place where the semi-legendary Viking stronghold of Jomsborg stood between the 950s and 1043.

According to Swedish archaeologist Sven Rosborn the entrance to the crypt was accidentally discovered by a 12-year-old Heinrich Boldt, who was playing with some younger children at a construction site near the ruined chapel.

The find consists of five objects today: a silver coin from Otto I's reign, a bracelet in bronze with a dash decoration covering the surface, a fragment of another bronze bracelet, a small stamped piece of gold and the Curmsun Disc itself.

After its original discovery the hoard was left in the crypt until 1945, when a Polish army major, Stefan Sielski, and his brother Michał entered and seized what was left of it. The disc did not appear to be made of gold so it was placed in a box with old buttons. In 2014, Michal Sielski's 11-year-old great-granddaughter showed the disc to her history teacher and it was reported in the press on 5 December 2014.

Interpretation

Researchers have interpreted the inscription on the obverse as: "+ARALD CVRMSVN+
REX AD TANER+SCON+JVMN+CIV ALDIN+".

CVRMSVN is a transliteration from spoken Old Norse via runes into the Medieval Latin alphabet.

Old Norse word in Latin alphabet:    	G O R M S O N

Written in runes (Younger Futhark):  	ᚴ ᚢ ᚱ ᛘ ᛋ ᚢ ᚾ

Transliterated to Latin alphabet:    	C V R M S V N	

The same phenomenon could be seen in some coins from York in the tenth century where king is transliterated as CVNVNC but translated as KONUNGR (in English: KONUNGR). Old Norse in coin inscriptions ended after the tenth century.

A full translation of the inscription reads: "Harald Gormson king of Danes, Scania, Jomsborg, town (or bishopric) Aldinburg (Oldenburg in Holstein)".

On the reverse there is an octagonal ridge, which runs around the edge of the object. In the centre of the octagonal ridge there is a Latin cross. There are four dots around the Latin cross. Similar dot markings are common on coins, even on coins from the late 900s. The four dots could possibly symbolize the four evangelists, whose symbols in the Middle Ages had strong associations with the Christ symbolism of the cross.

Dating theories

Around 960s - Harald Bluetooth's second marriage
Danish anthropologist Karen Schousboe believes that the Curmsun Disc could have been a wedding gift during Harald Bluetooth's second marriage, created in the 960s. Schousboe also sees a connection to 10th-12th century Byzantine talismans.

Around 985 - Harald Bluetooth's golden seal
Pontus Weman Tell theorized that the Curmsun Disc had been ordered as a golden seal by Theophanu to confirm or reinstall Harald Bluetooth on the throne. Through a philological analysis he concludes that the disc has most likely been produced before the introduction of the g-rune as Gormson is transliterated as CVRMSVN and not as GVRMSVN. Furthermore, the use of Old Norse like the word Taner on the Curmsun Disc ends in coin inscriptions in the beginning of the 11th century which strengthens a manufacturing date before 1000. Empress Theophanu who officially took over regency in the Holy Roman Empire in 985 could have ordered the Curmsun Disc as a decree to confirm or reinstall Harald on the throne to safeguard her minor son's interest.

Tell points out the significance of the octagon surrounding the Latin cross on the disc. According to him, octagon had special importance in the context of the Carolingian kingdom of Charlemagne the Great. Specifically, the Carolingian Octagon chapel in Aachen was commissioned before Charlemagne became the first Holy Roman Emperor. Thus, the octagonal shape of the disc seems to indicate its historical connection with the Holy Roman Empire.

Around 986 - Harald Bluetooth's death
According to a theory by Swedish archeologist Sven Rosborn, the Latin inscription on the obverse of the Curmsun Disc may have been created by a Frankish monk in connection with Harald Bluetooth's death around 986.

Rosborn points out that Adam of Bremen, the only historical source commenting on the death of Harald, says that Harald died in Jumne (Jomsborg) from his wounds. Yet, as Rosborn explains, Jumne probably did not have a Christian church, so Harald's body may have been buried, at least temporarily, in the nearest church located at Wiejkowo. Thus, the disc may have been placed near the burial.

According to Rosborn,

"With the language use that was current at the time of Harald’s life, the inscription CIV + ALDIN should thus be linked with the previous town name [Jumne]. The translation would then be "Jumne in the bishopric Aldinburg". Jumne was after all, according to Adam of Bremen, the place of King Harald's death, so the object’s closing inscription should thus, from a Christian point of view, pinpoint where Jumne was located."

Around 1100 – Harald Bluetooth canonized?
According to a theory in an article in the magazine  (published by Danish State Archives) written by Danish archivist Steffen Harpsøe the disc may have been created  by local priests around Jomsborg and Wiejkowo between 1050-1125. There is a possibility that the missionaries in the area canonized Harald Bluetooth and made the Curmsun Disc as a symbolic ornament. S. Harpsøe sees a connection between the Curmsun Disc and Byzantine seals and coins where the inscription are made in horizontal lines and the form could be concave.

Metallurgical analysis
The Curmsun Disc underwent electron microscopic analysis at Lund University in Sweden. The analysis showed a non-homogeneous alloy with a gold content ranging between 83.3-92.8%. The surface and alloy showed characteristics typical for artefacts created during the latest part of the Early Middle Ages. No traces of modern processes or chemicals were discovered. Surface analysis by a gemologist, Jonny Westling, appointed by the Swedish Chamber of Commerce in Stockholm and Lloyd's/Brookfield Underwriting, showed natural inclusions and patination.

Exhibition
The Curmsun disc is owned by an undisclosed company and deposited at a bank vault in Sweden. The disc's insured value is USD 3.5 million and the valuation has been performed by Jonny Westling, an expert appointed by Swedish Chamber of Commerce and Lloyds/Brookfield Underwriting.

See also
 Christianization of Scandinavia
 Harald Bluetooth
 Hiddensee treasure
 Bornholm amulet

References 

10th century in Denmark
10th-century inscriptions
1841 archaeological discoveries
1945 archaeological discoveries
2014 archaeological discoveries
Archaeological discoveries in Europe
Art discs and ovals
Artifacts in Norse mythology
Exonumia
Harald Bluetooth
House of Knýtlinga
Jomsvikings
Viking Age in Denmark